Eugène Jean François Balme (22 November 1874 – 24 February 1914) was a French sport shooter who competed at the 1900 Summer Olympics and 1908 Summer Olympics.

In 1900 at Paris he won the bronze medal in the 25 metre rapid fire pistol event. Eight years later at London he won another bronze medal in the team free rifle event and was fourth in team military rifle event.

He was born in Oullins and died in Paris. He committed suicide by shooting himself.

References

External links

profile

1874 births
1914 suicides
French male sport shooters
ISSF pistol shooters
Olympic bronze medalists for France
Olympic shooters of France
Shooters at the 1900 Summer Olympics
Shooters at the 1908 Summer Olympics
Place of birth missing
Olympic medalists in shooting
Suicides by firearm in France
Medalists at the 1900 Summer Olympics
Medalists at the 1908 Summer Olympics
People from Oullins
Sportspeople from Lyon Metropolis